Neil Campbell may refer to:

Sir Neil Campbell, known as Niall mac Cailein (died 1316), hero of the Wars of Scottish Independence
Neil Campbell (bishop of Argyll) (died 1613), Scots bishop
Neil Campbell (bishop of the Isles) (c. 1590–1645), Scots bishop
Lord Neill Campbell (c. 1630–1692), Scottish nobleman, governor of New Jersey, 1686–1687
Sir Neil Campbell (British Army officer) (1776–1827), fought in the Napoleonic Wars
Neil Campbell (minister) (1678–1761), Principal of Glasgow University and Moderator of the General Assembly of the Church of Scotland
Neil Campbell (politician) (1880–1960), Australian politician, Tasmanian Leader of the Opposition from 1945 to 1950
Neil Campbell (chemist) (1903–1996), Scottish chemist and amateur athlete
Neil Campbell (geologist) (1914–1978), Canadian geologist
Neil Campbell (rower) (1931–2006), Canadian rower and coach
Neil Campbell (scientist) (1946–2004), American author of biology textbooks
Neil Campbell (musician) (born 1966), British experimental musician
Neil Campbell (footballer) (1977–2022), English footballer
Neil Campbell (producer), comedian, writer, and producer

See also
Niall Campbell, 10th Duke of Argyll (1872–1949), British Lord Lieutenant of Argyllshire